Cláudia Graner (born January 14, 1974 in São Paulo) is a female water polo goalkeeper from Brazil, who won the bronze medal with the Brazil women's national water polo team at the 1999 Pan American Games, and 2003 Pan American Games.

She also competed at the 2003 World Aquatics Championships,

References

External links
 Profiles 

1974 births
Living people
Brazilian female water polo players
Water polo players from São Paulo
Brazilian people of German descent
Pan American Games bronze medalists for Brazil
Pan American Games medalists in water polo
Water polo players at the 1999 Pan American Games
Water polo players at the 2003 Pan American Games
Medalists at the 1999 Pan American Games
Medalists at the 2003 Pan American Games
21st-century Brazilian women